In information theory, specific-information is the generic name given to the family of state-dependent measures that in expectation converge to the mutual information.
The specific-information between a random variable  and a state  is written as :.

References

Information theory